Deborah Louise Brownson  (born October 1974) is a Solicitor and British autism campaigner. She campaigned successfully for autism to be included in teacher training and wrote a leading guide to the condition, He's Not Naughty!, told from the point of view of a child. She was awarded an MBE in March 2018 by Prince William, the Duke of Cornwall and Cambridge, for her outstanding contribution to global autism awareness.

Brownson's eldest son was diagnosed as severely autistic at 18 months. Frustrated with how his primary school was treating him she removed him at age 5 and homeschooled him for five months. She stopped working as a solicitor to focus on her role as caretaker. The notes she collected while caring for her son became He's Not Naughty! A Children's Guide to Autism.

Selected publications
He's Not Naughty! A Children's Guide to Autism
Life will never be dull. The little book of autism adventures.
Co-author 'Rebel Legs' by Frankie Warburton-Watts, a humorous guide to cerebral palsy.

References

External links

Deborah Brownson | Jessica Kingsley Publishers - UK (jkp.com)
Amazon.co.uk: Deborah Brownson MBE: Books, Biography, Blogs, Audiobooks, Kindle
MBE for author of 'instruction manual' for autism - BBC News
Deborah Brownson MBE – Reimagining Health)
He's Not Naughty! - New Autism blog from author Deborah Brownson (jkp.com)
Game changers • SEN Magazine
Deborah Brownson | Hachette UK
Frankie’s final project wows London crowds | tmc.ac.uk
Studio Tinto » The Autism Plan
Deborah Brownson MBE - Hart Jackson & Sons Solicitors
Deborah Louise Brownson MBE - The Law Society

Autism activists
British solicitors
British women lawyers
Living people
1974 births
Alumni of Manchester Metropolitan University
British health activists
Members of the Order of the British Empire